De Moortel or Van De Moortel is a surname. It is the surname of:
Arie Van de Moortel (1918–1976), Belgian musician and composer
Françoise Van De Moortel (1941–2005), Belgian journalist
Ineke De Moortel, Belgian applied mathematician
Joris van de Moortel, Belgian artist in BiennaleOnline
Mathilde Van de Moortel, winner of the 2016 César Award for Best Editing